The Admiralty Experiment Works (AEW)  was the British Admiralty research establishment, responsible for improving propeller design, manoeuvrability and seakeeping in Royal Navy vessels. The Experiment Works existed from 1872 to 1977 and for most of its history was based at the Haslar Gunboat Yard in Gosport, South Hampshire. It ceased independent operations in 1977, merging with the Admiralty Marine Technology Establishment and ultimately with the Defence Research Agency in the Ministry of Defence.

History
The Admiralty Experiment Works (AEW) was founded at Chelston Cross, Torquay, in 1872. It was Admiralty's first research establishment, and was initially structured around experimental work by engineer and naval architect William Froude, concerning methods to accelerate vessel propulsion. The Establishment was administered by the Director of Naval Construction, reporting to the Third Sea Lord in his capacity as Controller of the Navy. By 1886 its focus centered on the model testing of ship's hulls, and a year later was relocated  to wat would become its permanent home at the Haslar Gunboat Yard.

At Haslar, research again shifted to focus on predictions of ship power, hydrodynamics, submarine design and later propeller design in relation to ship manoeuvrability and seakeeping. As its work began to expand, new research testing facilities were established between 1930–1972 that enabled the works to extend their tests on models in a ship tank covering all classes of battleships, cruisers, destroyers, submarines and miscellaneous vessels. The results of these experiments were then used by Naval Construction Department enabling it to  improve ship design and performance. In 1958 the functions of the Director of Naval Construction became a division of the new Ship Department.

In 1977, AEW became part of the Admiralty Marine Technology Establishment, which itself in 1984 became a department of the unified Admiralty Research Establishment.

Timeline
 Board of Admiralty, Admiralty Experiment Works (AEW), (1872-1964)
 Ministry of Defence, Admiralty Experiment Works (AEW), (1964-1977)
 Ministry of Defence, Admiralty Marine Technology Establishment (AMTE), (1977-1984)
 Ministry of Defence, Admiralty Research Establishment (ARE), (1984-1991)
 Ministry of Defence,  Defence Research Agency, (1991-1995)

References

External links

Admiralty departments
Admiralty during World War I
Admiralty during World War II
Ministry of Defence Navy Department
1872 establishments in the United Kingdom
1977 disestablishments in the United Kingdom